I Wanna Be the Guy (IWBTG) is a freeware platform game created by Michael "Kayin" O'Reilly for Microsoft Windows using Multimedia Fusion 2. First released on October 5, 2007, the game is no longer in active development, though the game's source code was released by Kayin in 2011 and a remastered edition was released in 2020. IWBTG has unusually difficult platforming elements, unorthodox level design, and uses sound effects, characters, and music from many other games.

Gameplay

The player controls "The Kid". The controls are limited to left/right movement, jumping, double-jumping, and shooting. IWBTG is made up of several stages split into many screens, which are mostly pastiches of Nintendo Entertainment System games, such as Tetris, Ghosts 'n Goblins, The Legend of Zelda, Castlevania, Kirby, Mega Man, and Metroid. At the end of each stage, a boss must be defeated to progress. The first seven bosses (Mike Tyson; Mecha Birdo; Dracula; Kraidgief, a parody of palette-hacked character glitches; Mother Brain; Bowser, Wart, and Dr. Wily in the Koopa Clown Car; and a mix between the Mecha Dragon from Mega Man 2 and the Yellow Devil from Mega Man and Mega Man 3) are adapted from classic games, mostly platformers, but their behavior and appearance have been modified and enhanced for IWBTG. The final boss, The Kid's father, is unique to IWBTG. The game parodies many 8-bit and 16-bit era video games, such as the frequent use of references and sound effects from the Nintendo game Mario Paint.

IWBTG is most famous for its difficulty. Most of the landscape is engineered specifically to kill the player character. Alongside a traditional range of recognizable dangers, such as spikes and pits, there are many less obvious threats as well, most of which are all but impossible to avoid without either previous knowledge or trial and error (such as Tetris pieces and "Delicious Fruit", which can fall downwards, upwards, or sideways). The Kid always dies with a single hit, at which point he explodes into a mass of blood. Although each death results in a "Game Over", the player is allowed an infinite number of attempts. From the starting screen, there are three different ways to progress; all of them ultimately lead to the same warp screen which returns to the first screen. Thus, to complete the game, the first six bosses along each path must be defeated before the warp screen will allow the player to access the final area.

The game has four difficulty settings: "Medium", "Hard", "Very Hard", and "Impossible", with "Hard" considered to be the "normal difficulty". The only difference in gameplay between the difficulty settings is the number of save points available throughout the game, with 62 in Medium mode, 41 in Hard mode, 22 in Very Hard mode, and none at all in Impossible mode. Also, while playing on Medium mode, The Kid's hair has a pink bow in it, and any save points exclusive to Medium difficulty are labeled "WUSS" instead of "SAVE".

Plot
Like many games that IWBTG parodies, the game's plot is straightforward and does not heavily impact gameplay. The player controls "The Kid", who is on a mission to become "The Guy". The entirety of the plot is given in a message during the opening credits, a parody of bad Japanese translations and broken English in early NES games.

At the end, The Kid reaches The Guy, who reveals that he not only killed "Former Grandfather The Guy", but that he is also "The Father" to The Kid. A battle between the two takes place ending with The Kid becoming "The New Guy".

Development
Kayin describes the game as "a sardonic loveletter to the halcyon days of early American video gaming, packaged as a nail-rippingly difficult platform adventure". The inspiration came from a challenging Japanese Flash game on 2channel called , which Kayin played and thought he could outdo due to it being incomplete at the time.

On November 9, 2011, Kayin released the source code of the game under his own software license (forbidding new content), so that the game's community would be able to create fixes and patches.

Legacy
"The Kid" is an unlockable secret character in Super Meat Boy (2010). He also appears as an assist in the upcoming fighting game Fraymakers.

Prequel and sequel
Two months after the release of IWBTG, Kayin announced a prequel titled I Wanna Save the Kids. IWSTK features "The Kid" escorting children back to their home. On the way, The Kid has to save these kids and himself from various dangers, as well as bringing them to the next level. The game closely parallels the classic computer game Lemmings, while still maintaining the notorious difficulty of IWBTG. The game is no longer in development, though a demo is available.

After the success of fighting game competitor Ari "Floe" Weintraub streaming his playthroughs of IWBTG and multiple fangames, Kayin announced a sequel on June 26, 2012 titled I Wanna Be the Guy: Gaiden. Originally planned as an episodic series (though only one episode was released), IWBTG:G has "The Lad" trying to find "The Kid" after his ascent to Guy-dom. The game was first featured in the 2012 iteration of the Evolution Fighting Game Tournament with Floe playing.

Remaster 
On December 22, 2020, a small group of fans remastered the game using the Yuuutu community fangame engine and Game Maker 8. The remaster was acknowledged by Kayin himself, citing it as a "best case scenario" and a "perfect package for anyone who wants to play IWBTG who isn't some super specific game "research" type". The remaster is intended to make the game more accessible by removing the compatibility issues and frequent crashing caused by running the original game in newer Windows versions.

Fangames 
I Wanna Be the Boshy, a 2010 fangame which is considered to be even more difficult than IWBTG, is popular in the speedrunning community.

There are thousands of fangames that were made by individuals and teams inspired by IWBTG using the same controls and almost the same physics.

Reception
In "Critical games: Critical design in independent games", Lindsay Grace describes the game as one that critiques the logic and illogic of platform games in a way that questions the underlying assumptions of the genre.  Shaun Prescott similarly describes it as a self-critiquing game, noting that it "subverts the learning process of games by constantly breaking the rules."

The game has been categorized as "masocore", a descriptor for games with intentionally unfair design.

See also
 Battle Kid: Fortress of Peril
 Syobon Action

References

External links
 

2007 video games
Freeware games
Indie video games
Parody video games
Patricide in fiction
Platform games
Retro-style video games
Video games developed in the United States
Video games with available source code
Windows games
Windows-only games
Clickteam Fusion games